Burnham-on-Sea railway station was located within the town of Burnham-on-Sea, Somerset, and was the terminus of the Burnham branch of the Somerset and Dorset Joint Railway. Opened as Burnham by the Somerset Central Railway on 3 May 1858, it was renamed in 1920.

History 
The station, situated behind Abingdon Street, was a terminus although a through platform allowed services to travel on to a  S&DJR built stone pier on the River Severn/River Parrett estuary. For a few years the railway operated steamers across the Bristol Channel to Wales. Railway operations onto the pier ceased in 1888 although the pier continued in use for vessels until the 1950s.

Perhaps the strangest use of the railway along the pier was by the local area lifeboat, which was pushed on rails from the old lifeboat station (located behind the former Morrisons supermarket) and onto the "main line", across the esplanade, and down the pier where the lifeboat could be launched if the tide was right.

Burnham-on-Sea closed when regular passenger services were curtailed at Highbridge on 28 October 1951. Excursion traffic continued until 1962, and the goods depot remained open until 1963.

Today
After the station's closure, the station building, main platform and goods shed were demolished. The excursion platform remained on the derelict site for over a decade, until the former trackbed eastwards was developed into Marine Drive, a road which has helped ease traffic flow into the town. The location of the station itself is on the junction of Old Station Approach and Abingdon Street, and the former goods yard is now a small car park. An adjacent pub on the High Street was subsequently renamed the Somerset & Dorset. The new RNLI station and yard occupy land to the south and east of the former main station building, adjacent to the site of the former excursion platform. The first ever specifically designed Somerfield supermarket was built to the seaward-west side, which was then sold to Morrisons. The site is now a B&M store.

Sources

References

External links
https://web.archive.org/web/20090107024117/http://www.sdjr.net/locations/burnham.html
https://web.archive.org/web/20071004221118/http://www.burnham-on-sea.com/burnham-railway-station.shtml
https://www.bbc.co.uk/iplayer/episode/b03495yn/lets-imagine-a-branch-line-railway-with-john-betjeman

Former Somerset and Dorset Joint Railway stations
Disused railway stations in Somerset
Railway stations in Great Britain opened in 1858
Railway stations in Great Britain closed in 1963
Burnham-on-Sea